Cherry Sor Wanich (born May 30, 1969 in Khon Kaen)  is a former Thai Muay Thai fighter.

Biography and career
Cherry started Muay Thai at the age of 12 fighting for various camps until the age of 17 when he joined the Sor wanich gym in Chonburi, he would spend the rest of his career there.

He was a popular fighter of the Bangkok circuit with purses going as high as 250,000 THB.

After his retirement Cherry spent time in Macau working as a bodyguard.

Titles and honours
 Muay Thai world champion
Lumpinee Stadium
 1989 Lumpinee Stadium (130 lbs) Champion (3 defenses)
Omnoi Stadium
 1988 Tiger Power XD-3 tournament winner
Sports Writers Association of Thailand
 1989 Fight of the year (vs Jaroenthong Kiatbanchong)

Fight record

|-  style="background:#fbb;"
| 1996-08-17 || Loss||align=left| Prabseuklek Sitnarong || Lumpinee Stadium  || Bangkok, Thailand || Decision || 5 || 3:00
|-  style="background:#fbb;"
| 1995- || Loss||align=left| Jongsanan Fairtex ||  || Bangkok, Thailand || Decision || 5 || 3:00
|-  style="background:#fbb;"
| 1995- || Loss||align=left| Jongsanan Fairtex ||  || Bangkok, Thailand || Decision || 5 || 3:00
|-  style="background:#cfc;"
| 1995- || Win ||align=left| Ramon Dekkers || Lumpinee Stadium || Bangkok, Thailand || Decision || 5 ||
|-  style="background:#fbb;"
| 1995-06-10 || Loss||align=left| Chatchai Paiseetong || Lumpinee Stadium || Bangkok, Thailand || Decision || 5 || 3:00
|-  style="background:#cfc;"
| 1995-05-23 || Win ||align=left| Den Muangsurin || Lumpinee Stadium || Bangkok, Thailand || Decision || 5 || 3:00
|-  style="background:#fbb;"
| 1994-02-15 || Loss||align=left| Orono Por Muang Ubon || Lumpinee Stadium || Bangkok, Thailand || Decision || 5 || 3:00
|-  style="background:#fbb;"
| 1993-10-18 || Loss ||align=left| Mathee Jadeepitak || Lumpinee Stadium || Bangkok, Thailand || Decision || 5 || 3:00
|-  style="background:#fbb;"
| 1993-09-11 || Loss ||align=left| Rittichai Lookmaesaithong || Lumpinee Stadium || Bangkok, Thailand || Decision || 5 || 3:00
|-  style="background:#fbb;"
| 1993-08-13 || Loss ||align=left| Chotchai Chuchokchai || Lumpinee Stadium || Bangkok, Thailand || Decision || 5 || 3:00

|-  style="background:#fbb;"
| 1993-07-11|| Loss||align=left| Pairot.Wor.Wolapon ||   || Nakhon Sawan Province, Thailand || Decision || 5 || 3:00
|-  style="background:#fbb;"
| 1993-04-30 || Loss ||align=left| Rittichai Lookmaesaithong || Lumpinee Stadium || Bangkok, Thailand || Decision || 5 || 3:00
|-  style="background:#fbb;"
| 1993-03-04 || Loss||align=left| Superlek Sorn E-Sarn || Lumpinee Stadium || Bangkok, Thailand || KO (Punches) || 3 ||
|-  style="background:#cfc;"
| 1993-02-22 || Win ||align=left| Buakaw Por Pisichet || Rajadamnern Stadium || Bangkok, Thailand || Decision || 5 || 3:00
|-  style="background:#fbb;"
| 1993-01-29 || Loss ||align=left| Chandet Sor Prantalay || Lumpinee Stadium || Bangkok, Thailand || Decision || 5 ||3:00
|-  style="background:#cfc;"
| 1993-01-08 || Win ||align=left| Orono Por Muang Ubon || Lumpinee Stadium || Bangkok, Thailand || Decision || 5 || 3:00
|-  style="background:#fbb;"
| 1992-11-30 || Loss||align=left| Superlek Sorn E-Sarn || Lumpinee Stadium || Bangkok, Thailand || KO (Punches) || 3 ||
|-  style="background:#fbb;"
| 1992-10-13 || Loss||align=left| Therdkiat Sitthepitak || Lumpinee Stadium || Bangkok, Thailand || Decision || 5 || 3:00
|-  style="background:#cfc;"
| 1992-09-25 || Win ||align=left| Jaroenthong Kiatbanchong || Lumpinee Stadium || Bangkok, Thailand || Decision || 5 || 3:00
|-  style="background:#fbb;"
| 1992-08- || Loss ||align=left| Sakmongkol Sithchuchok || Lumpinee Stadium || Bangkok, Thailand || Decision  || 5 || 3:00
|-  style="background:#fbb;"
| 1992-07-07 || Loss ||align=left| Sangtiennoi Sor.Rungroj || Lumpinee Stadium || Bangkok, Thailand  || Decision || 5 || 3:00
|-  style="background:#cfc;"
| 1992-06-09 || Win ||align=left| Chandet Sor Prantalay || Lumpinee Stadium || Bangkok, Thailand || Decision || 5 ||3:00
|- style="background:#fbb;"
| 1992-04-07 || Loss||align=left| Wangchannoi Sor Palangchai  || Lumpinee Stadium ||  Bangkok, Thailand  || KO (Right uppercut)|| 2 ||
|-  style="background:#cfc;"
| 1992-03-10|| Win ||align=left| Oley Kiatoneway || Lumpinee Stadium || Bangkok, Thailand || KO (Knees) || 4 ||
|-  style="background:#cfc;"
| 1992-02-21 || Win ||align=left| Orono Por Muang Ubon || Lumpinee Stadium || Bangkok, Thailand || Decision || 5 ||3:00
|-  style="background:#fbb;"
| 1992-01-21 || Loss ||align=left| Sakmongkol Sithchuchok || Lumpinee Stadium || Bangkok, Thailand || Decision  || 5 || 3:00
|-  style="background:#fbb;"
| 1992-01-07 || Loss ||align=left| Sangtiennoi Sor.Rungroj || Lumpinee Stadium || Bangkok, Thailand  || Decision || 5 || 3:00
|- style="background:#fbb;"
| 1991-12- || Loss||align=left| Jongsanan Luklongbankaew || Lumpinee Stadium ||  Bangkok, Thailand  || Decision || 5 || 3:00

|-  style="background:#cfc;"
| 1991-10-25|| Win ||align=left| Boonlai Sor.Thanikul || Lumpinee Stadium || Bangkok, Thailand || Decision || 5 || 3:00

|- style="background:#fbb;"
| 1991-09-24 || Loss||align=left| Jongsanan Luklongbankaew  || Lumpinee Stadium ||  Bangkok, Thailand  || Decision || 5 || 3:00
|- style="background:#fbb;"
| 1991-09-03 || Loss||align=left| Wangchannoi Sor Palangchai  || Lumpinee Stadium ||  Bangkok, Thailand  || Decision || 5 || 3:00

|- style="background:#fbb;"
| 1991-05-31 || Loss ||align=left| Namkabuan Nongkeepahuyuth || Lumpinee Stadium || Bangkok, Thailand  || Decision || 5 || 3:00
|-
! style=background:white colspan=9 |

|-  bgcolor="#cfc"
| 1991-02-15 || Win ||align=left| Panomrunglek Chor.Sawat || Muangchai Kittikasem vs Sot Chitalada||  Ayutthaya Province, Thailand || Decision || 5 || 3:00

|-  style="background:#fbb;"
| 1991-01-04 || Loss ||align=left| Sangtiennoi Sor.Rungroj || Lumpinee Stadium || Bangkok, Thailand || KO (Knee to the Head) || 3 ||
|-
! style=background:white colspan=9 |
|-  style="background:#fbb;"
| 1990-11-27 || Loss ||align=left| Superlek Sorn E-Sarn || Lumpinee Stadium || Bangkok, Thailand || KO (Punches)|| 5 ||
|-  style="background:#cfc;"
| 1990-10-30 || Win ||align=left| Therdkiat Sitthepitak || Lumpinee Stadium || Bangkok, Thailand || Decision || 5 || 3:00
|-  style="background:#cfc;"
| 1990-10-12 || Win ||align=left| Superlek Sorn E-Sarn || Lumpinee Stadium || Bangkok, Thailand || Decision|| 5 ||3:00
|-  style="background:#cfc;"
| 1990-08-31 || Win ||align=left| Therdkiat Sitthepitak || Lumpinee Stadium || Bangkok, Thailand || Decision || 5 || 3:00
|-
! style=background:white colspan=9 |
|-  style="background:#cfc;"
| 1990-07-29 || Win ||align=left| Jaroenthong Kiatbanchong ||  || Arizona, United States || Decision || 5 || 3:00

|-  style="background:#c5d2ea;"
| 1990-06-29 || Draw||align=left| Jaroenthong Kiatbanchong || Lumpinee Stadium || Bangkok, Thailand || Decision || 5 || 3:00
|-  style="background:#fbb;"
| 1990-05-27 || Loss ||align=left| Ramon Dekkers || || Amsterdam, Netherlands || KO (Left hook) || 1 ||
|-  style="background:#cfc;"
| 1990-04-24 || Win ||align=left| Petchdam Lukborai ||  || Bangkok, Thailand || Decision|| 5 || 3:00
|-  style="background:#cfc;"
| 1990-03-30 || Win ||align=left| Superlek Sorn E-Sarn || Lumpinee Stadium || Bangkok, Thailand || TKO (Knees)|| 4 ||
|-
! style=background:white colspan=9 |
|-  style="background:#cfc;"
| 1990-02-06 || Win ||align=left| Namphon Nongkee Pahuyuth|| Lumpinee Stadium || Bangkok, Thailand || Decision|| 5 || 3:00
|-  style="background:#c5d2ea;"
| 1990-01-19 || Draw ||align=left| Namphon Nongkee Pahuyuth|| Lumpinee Stadium || Bangkok, Thailand || Decision|| 5 || 3:00
|-  style="background:#cfc;"
| 1989-12-31 || Win||align=left| Jo PrestiaJoel Cesar || 2 vs 1  || Paris, France || Decision  || 5 || 3:00
|-
! style=background:white colspan=9 |
|-  style="background:#c5d2ea;"
| 1989-11-28 || Draw ||align=left| Namphon Nongkee Pahuyuth|| Lumpinee Stadium || Bangkok, Thailand || Decision|| 5 || 3:00
|-  style="background:#c5d2ea;"
| 1989-11-07 || Draw ||align=left| Namphon Nongkee Pahuyuth|| Lumpinee Stadium || Bangkok, Thailand || Decision|| 5 || 3:00
|-  style="background:#cfc;"
| 1989-10-06 || Win||align=left| Saencherng Pinsinchai|| Lumpinee Stadium  || Bangkok, Thailand || Decision|| 5 || 3:00 
|-
! style=background:white colspan=9 |
|-  style="background:#fbb;"
| 1989-08-15 || Loss||align=left| Jaroenthong Kiatbanchong || Lumpinee Stadium || Bangkok, Thailand || Decision || 5 || 3:00
|-  style="background:#cfc;"
| 1989-07-25 || Win||align=left| Saencherng Pinsinchai|| Lumpinee Stadium  || Bangkok, Thailand || Decision|| 5 || 3:00 
|-
! style=background:white colspan=9 |

|-  style="background:#cfc;"
| 1989-06-26 || Win ||align=left| Namphon Nongkee Pahuyuth|| Rajadamnern Stadium || Bangkok, Thailand || Decision|| 5 || 3:00
|-  style="background:#cfc;"
| 1989-05-30 || Win ||align=left| Chanchai Sor Tamarangsri || Lumpinee Stadium  || Bangkok, Thailand || Decision  || 5 || 3:00
|-  style="background:#cfc;"
| 1989-05-12 || Win ||align=left| Samransak Muangsurin || Lumpinee Stadium  || Bangkok, Thailand || Decision  || 5 || 3:00
|-  style="background:#c5d2ea;"
| 1989-04-07 || Draw||align=left| Samransak Muangsurin || Lumpinee Stadium  || Bangkok, Thailand || Decision  || 5 || 3:00
|-  style="background:#c5d2ea;"
| 1989-03-10|| Draw ||align=left| Dokmaipa Por Pongsawang || Lumpinee Stadium  || Bangkok, Thailand || Decision || 5 || 3:00
|-  style="background:#cfc;"
| 1989-02-21 || Win||align=left| Sanphet Lukrangesee || Lumpinee Stadium  || Bangkok, Thailand || Decision || 5 || 3:00
|-  style="background:#c5d2ea;"
| 1989-01-31 || Draw ||align=left| Sanphet Lukrangesee ||   || Ratchaburi Province, Thailand || Decision || 5 || 3:00
|-  style="background:#cfc;"
| 1988-12-17 || Win ||align=left| Boonchai Tor Thuwanon|| Omnoi Stadium - Tiger Power XD-3 Tournament Final || Samut Sakhon, Thailand || Decision  || 5 || 3:00
|-
! style=background:white colspan=9 |
|-  style="background:#cfc;"
| 1988-11-05 || Win ||align=left| Laonoi Siyodtong|| Omnoi Stadium - Tiger Power XD-3 Tournament Semi Final || Samut Sakhon, Thailand || Decision  || 5 || 3:00
|-  style="background:#cfc;"
| 1988-10-08 || Win ||align=left| Rak Sakdiprasang || Omnoi Stadium - Tiger Power XD-3 Tournament  || Samut Sakhon, Thailand || KO ||  ||
|-  style="background:#cfc;"
| 1988-09-03 || Win ||align=left| Ratchaput Sor.Thanikul || Omnoi Stadium - Tiger Power XD-3 Tournament  || Samut Sakhon, Thailand || Decision  || 5 || 3:00
|-  style="background:#cfc;"
| 1988-08-06 || Win ||align=left| Kanongsuk Sityomnoi || Omnoi Stadium - Tiger Power XD-3 Tournament  || Samut Sakhon, Thailand || Decision  || 5 || 3:00
|-  style="background:#cfc;"
| 1988- || Win ||align=left| Bangkhlanoi Sor.Thanikul ||   || Bangkok, Thailand || Decision  || 5 || 3:00
|-
| colspan=9 | Legend:

References

1969 births
Cherry Sor Wanich
Living people
Cherry Sor Wanich